My Cat Is An Alien (MCIAA) is an Italian musical duo and outsider audiovisual artist consisting of brothers Maurizio and Roberto Opalio, formed in Torino, Italy, in late 1997. The band releases avant garde / experimental music in a form of improvisation that MCIAA themselves define 'instantaneous composition'.

MCIAA's first live show was supporting Sonic Youth in 1998. Thurston Moore from, Sonic Youth is a fan and has collaborated with the duo and released some of their material on his own Ecstatic Peace! record label.

Thurston Moore and Byron Coley wrote on Arthur Magazine, 

MCIAA's work range over many artistic activities: musical performance, films and videos, audiovisual installations, poetry, drawing, photography, painting.

In September 2011, My Cat Is An Alien were the cover feature in The Wire magazine.

Releases 
My Cat Is An Alien is one of the most prolific groups in the international experimental music scene, with more than 100 records in their first 13 years of activity.

Tony Herrington, editor-in-chief & publisher of The Wire, characterizes the duo as

The group has a large number of albums and side project material which is widely available on CDs, LPs and digital downloads released by the labels Atavistic (USA), Important (USA), Very Friendly/ Cargo (UK), P.S.F. (Japan), and Elliptical Noise (CAN) among many others.

All MCIAA's album covers come from paintings, drawings and photographs by Roberto Opalio. Since artwork is a basic aspect of every record, MCIAA often release limited art edition vinyls, lathe cuts, cassettes, CD-Rs and DVD-Rs on their own Opax Records imprint, and other independent record labels.

In their early years, MCIAA made all recordings in the 'Space Room', the duo's first studio, located in an abandoned factory zone to the north of Torino city centre. As expression of their DIY aesthetics they self-released many limited CD-Rs during that period.

MCIAA's international debut album Landscapes Of An Electric City/ Hypnotic Spaces 3-sided LP on Thurston Moore's Ecstatic Peace! label in 2002 earned high marks from Dusted Magazine (volcanic, both in sound quality and seeping magnitude…floating, impressionistic noise.") and Bananafish Magazine, and a special mention on the book Post Rock (Giunti).

From 2004 MCIAA put out three consecutive vinyl releases on Eclipse Records—The Rest Is Silence (2004), When The Windmill's Whirl Dies (2005), and Greetings From The Great Void (2006)— later intended as a trilogy.

Another concept album collecting some of their most remarkable ambient, instrumental works, The Cosmological Eye Trilogy, was published as a 3 CD set on Last Visible Dog Records and awarded as "BEST 2005 ANTHOLOGY" by Foxy Digitalis, hereby introduced by editor-in-chief Brad Rose:

After other key works such as Il Segno (Starlight Furniture Co., 2003), and Through The Reflex Of The Rain (Free Porcupine Society, 2005), in 2005 Important Records started releasing some albums that were met with praise by critics and contemporaries alike—Cosmic Light Of The Third Millennium (2005), Leave Me In The Black No-Thing (2007), For The Tears Of The Land_Prayers From The Outer Space (2009), Roberto Opalio's soloist debut Chants From Isolated Ghosts (2007), and an untitled limited split vinyl LP of solo works by the two brothers (2009)—

claimed Ed Pinsent, editor & publisher of The Sound Projector Magazine.

Different Shades Of Blue, published by defunct label A Silent Place in 2006, has been awarded album of 2005 in the Top 30 chart "THE BEST OF AMBIENT WORKS 1978-2008" by the prestigious Studio Voice multi-media magazine and book publications in Japan.

In 2005 the Opalio brothers moved their recording studio from Torino to a remote and secret location in the Western Alps they call 'Alien Zone', where Roberto introduced his wordless vocalizations as a leading instrument. In this regard English writer Ken Hollings, author of MCIAA cover article in The Wire, states:

From the vastness of the Alpine territory, the brothers released new key works, including Black Shadows From Jupiter, Vol.I & II (Opax Records, 2005 / Elliptical Noise, 2009), Photoelectric Season (Elliptical Noise, 2010), and Fragments Suspended In Time (Opax Records, 2010).

Starting from 2009, most of their new albums are published by their devoted Canadian label Elliptical Noise Records, that in 2011 put out the triple CD set What Space Is Made For, whose track The Antigravitational Sense Of Nothingness is featured in Wire Tapper 25 CD Compilation accompanying The Wire magazine No. 326 (April 2011).

In 2008 My Cat Is An Alien also signed for Atavistic Worldwide.

On September 14, 2011 My Cat Is An Alien's first thirteen years of activity were celebrated with ALIENOLOGY: Selected Works 1998-2008, a ten disc box retrospective published by Elliptical Noise.

Collaborations 
My Cat Is An Alien have multimedia collaborations with acts such as Sonic Youth, Thurston Moore, Lee Ranaldo, Christian Marclay, Keiji Haino, Jim O'Rourke, Loren Mazzacane Connors, Jackie-O Motherfucker, Nels Cline (Wilco), Text of Light, Steve Roden, Christina Carter (Charalambides), Mats Gustafsson, Enore Zaffiri and many more.

In July 2004 MCIAA started a project of collaboration with some of these artists in the form of two series of special split Art-LP releases (later re-issued on CD) entitled From the earth to the Spheres (7 volumes) and Cosmic Debris (5 volumes), which have been acclaimed as some of the most original publications in the record history, every vinyl copy coming along a proper 30x30 cm acrylic painting on canvas or wood panels, in the latter series with the addition of installed Polaroid films. Roberto Opalio realized every volume in 100 unique exemplars, individually signed and numbered. The From the earth to the Spheres series has been awarded 2004's “Avant Rock Top 10" by The Wire.

 wrote Edwin Pouncey (The Wire), 

At the beginning of 2008 My Cat Is An Alien were introduced to Italian pioneer of electronic music Enore Zaffiri (at the time 80 years old). In February, the trio recorded some completely improvised material, with Zaffiri re-working some of his reel-to-reel tapes from the 1960s. Despite their opposite methods in composing music, a strong musical connection is documented by this session released by Atavistic in the CD+DVD set entitled Through The Magnifying Glass Of Tomorrow (2009), also featuring two art films: Trasparenze (by Zaffiri) and Light_Earth_Blue_Silver (by Roberto Opalio, with soundtrack by MCIAA).

In 2008, Roberto Opalio and My Cat Is An Alien were invited by Sonic Youth to take part in  Sonic Youth etc.: Sensational Fix exhibition. At the opening at LiFE museum in St-Nazaire, France, MCIAA joined Lee Ranaldo (Sonic Youth) for a special live music performance collaboration, along with Michael Morley (Dead C), and Opalio's close collaborator Ramona Ponzini (Painting Petals On Planet Ghost), later released by Starlight Furniture Co. in a limited vinyl edition—Live @ Sensational Fix, 2009. Later that year, a further collaborative live event with Lee Ranaldo occurred in Verona, Italy, this time close to the second opening of the same exhibition at Museion in Bolzano. In 2010 Atavistic released it on CD with the title All Is Lost In Translation.

Instrumentation 
Multi-instrumentalists, My Cat Is An Alien primarily play electric and acoustic guitars, various toy instruments (so-called 'space toys'), modified electronics ('alientronics') and a wide set of percussion. Roberto Opalio's use of wordless vocalizations are also present on many tracks.

Live performances 
My Cat Is An Alien's shamanic-like live performances are rare; during the years they showed up only at selected special events, and some of the most prestigious international festivals of avant garde and experimental music: K-RAA-K (Belgium), Ferrara Sotto Le Stelle (Italy), the Festival International de Musique Actuelle de Victoriaville (Canada), whose recording has been released through Les Disques VICTO (Il Suono Venuto dallo Spazio, 2006), and ATP Nightmare Before Christmas curated by Thurston Moore (UK), were MCIAA were introduced this way:

 - Byron Coley

Audiovisual art 
Before starting their musical career, Maurizio and especially Roberto Opalio had interests in visual arts, operating in almost all disciplines, painting, photography, drawing, poetry, sculpture, audiovisual installation, film and videos were practiced by Opalio. All of the artworks of My Cat Is An Alien's records represent paintings, photos and drawings by Roberto Opalio, and are curated personally by the duo, thus giving a totally peculiar visual aspect to their musical releases.

In 2005 Roberto Opalio has been commissioned to design an exclusive T-shirt for The Wire magazine.

In 2008, Roberto Opalio and My Cat Is An Alien were invited by Sonic Youth to take part to Sonic Youth etc.: Sensational Fix exhibition, scheduled in big European museums of contemporary arts between 2008 and 2010. Other than the official exhibition catalog published by Walter Koenig, curator Roland Groenenboom presented a spin-off limited zine at Malmo Konsthall, featuring exclusive artworks by Roberto Opalio and MCIAA, alongside Christian Marclay, Savage Pencil, Barbara Ess, Marco Fusinato.

Roberto Opalio contributed to this exhibition with Alien Guitar Case No. 6, one in his series of installations made of the artist's multimedia artworks and objects incorporated into MCIAA's used guitar cases; and his film entitled Alien Blood (2005–2008), whose soundtrack by MCIAA was issued in a very limited vinyl art edition on Opax Records, and later included in ALIENOLOGY: Selected Works 1998-2008 (2011).

In 2009 Atavistic published on DVD Roberto Opalio's dual film Light_Earth_Blue_Silver (2008), that the artist himself claims as "proudly filmed in 8mm" up on a desolate track in Western Alps. The soundtrack is by My Cat Is An Alien. The film was presented at Netwerk Center for Contemporary Art in Aalst (Belgium) in March 2009, at Octubre CCC (Centre de Cultura Contemporània) in Valencia (Spain) in April 2009, at Netmage.10 International Live-Media Festival at Palazzo Re Enzo, Bologna (Italy) in January 2010. Ken Hollings writes about it in his cover article (The Wire, No. 331): 
The same article shows pictures and works taken in the Opalio brothers' studio for visual arts, named 'Alien Studio'.

Discography 
ALBUMS
 s/t CD-r (Opax Records, 1998)
 Landscapes Of An Electric City CD-r (Opax Records/ ZZZ Prod.,1999)
 The Alien cd-r Attack Series! Vol. I - Alien Holland Invasion - CD-r (Opax Records, 2000)
 The Alien cd-r Attack Series! Vol. II - Infinite lights above us - CD-r (Opax Records, 2001)
 The Alien cd-r Attack Series! Vol. III - “...Ascends The Sky" - CD-r (Opax Records, 2001)
 Landscapes Of An Electric City/ Hypnotic Spaces 3-sided LP (Ecstatic Peace!, 2002)
 Out Of The Blue___Into The White 3CD-r set (Opax Records, 2003)
 Il Segno LP / CD (Starlight Furniture Co., 2003/ 2007)
 The Rest Is Silence 2LP (Eclipse Records, 2004)
 The First Flame Of Tomorrow CD-r (Opax Records, 2004)
 Floating In The Void CD-r (Opax Records, 2004)
 Through The Reflex Of The Rain CD (Free Porcupine Society, 2005)
 When The Windmill's Whirl Dies LP (Eclipse Records, 2005)
 Different Shades Of Blue CD-r / LP (U-Sound Archive, 2005 / A Silent Place, 2006)
 Black Shadows From Jupiter LP (Opax Records, 2005)
 Alien Minds C60 cassette (Sloow Tapes, 2005)
 Plutonian Flames 2CD-r (Opax Records, 2005)
 The Cosmological Eye Trilogy 3CD (Last Visible Dog, 2005)
 Astral Key CD-r (Esquilo, 2005)
 Folclore Alieno CD-r (Opax Records, 2006)
 There's A Flame___Sometimes LP (Rococo Records, 2006 / Opax Records, 2008)
 Listen Before Black Falls LP (Root Strata, 2006)
 Cosmic Light Of The Third Millennium CD (Important Records, 2006)
 The Secret Of The Dancing Snow CD (Ikuisuus, 2006)
 "...Ascends The Sky" CD (Rebis/Whitened Sepulchre, 2006)
 Greetings From The Great Void 2LP (Eclipse Records, 2006)
 Il Suono Venuto dalo Spazio CD (Les Disques VICTO, 2006)
 On Air At Sound Projecting CD-r / LP (Opax Records, 2005 / 2006)
 Leave Me In The Black No-Thing CD (Important Records, 2007)
 Into The White Vortex 1-sided ART-LP (Opax Records, 2007)
 "Speak, alien, SPEAK!" 3 C20 cassette set (Opax Records, 2007)
 Sotto Le Stelle etched ART-LP (Lost Treasures of the Underworld, 2008)
 Alien Blood LP (Opax Records, 2008)
 For the tears of the Land_Prayers from the outer space (split with Praxinoscope) 2LP / 2CD (Important Records, 2009 / Elliptical Noise, 2009)
 Through The Magnifying Glass Of Tomorrow (with Enore Zaffiri) CD+DVD (Atavistic, 2009)
 Mort Aux Vaches CD (Staalplaat, Mort Aux Vaches series, 2009)
 Live @ Sensational Fix (with Michael Morley, Ramona Ponzini, Lee Ranaldo) LP (Starlight Furniture Co., 2009)
 Black Shadows from Jupiter, Vol. I & II 2CD (Elliptical Noise, 2010)
 Photoelectric Season 2CD (Elliptical Noise, 2010)
 My Cat Is An Alien & Bjerga/Iversen LP (Ikuisuus / Gold Soundz, 2010)
 Fragments Suspended In Time LP + CD + DVD (Opax Records, 2010)
 All Is Lost In Translation (with Ramona Ponzini, Lee Ranaldo) CD (Atavistic, 2010)
 Gramofonu = voice of the Universe (with BBNU) LP (Opax Records / Love Nest, 2011)
 What Space Is Made For 3CD Box (Elliptical Noise, 2011)
 Alienology: Selected Works 1998-2008 10CD Box (Elliptical Noise, 2011)
 Living On The Invisible Line LP (Divorce, 2011)

COLLABORATIVE ALBUMS

 Thurston Moore / My Cat Is An Alien - 'From the earth to the Spheres, vol.1' split ART-LP / CD (Opax Records, 2004 / Very Friendly/ CARGO UK, 2004)
 Thuja / My Cat Is An Alien - 'From the earth to the Spheres, vol.2' split ART-LP / CD (Opax Records, 2004 / Very Friendly/ CARGO UK, 2004)
 Jackie-O Motherfucker / My Cat Is An Alien - 'From the earth to the Spheres, vol.3' split ART-LP / CD (Opax Records, 2004 / Very Friendly/ CARGO UK, 2005)
 Jim O'Rourke / My Cat Is An Alien - 'From the earth to the Spheres, vol.4' split ART-LP (Opax Records, 2005)
 Christina Carter & Andrew MacGregor / My Cat Is An Alien - 'From the earth to the Spheres, vol.5' split ART-LP / CD (Opax Records, 2005 / Very Friendly/ CARGO UK, 2005)
 Glands Of External Secretion with Nels Cline / My Cat Is An Alien - 'From the earth to the Spheres, vol.6' split ART-LP / CD (Opax Records, 2005 / Very Friendly/ CARGO UK, 2006)
 Christian Marclay & Okkyung Lee / My Cat Is An Alien - 'From the earth to the Spheres, vol.7' split ART-LP / CD (Opax Records, 2006 / A Silent Place, 2006)
 Tony Herrington / My Cat Is An Alien - 'Joint Multiples 04' Box/CD-R/Painting/Polaroid/Painted Photograph (no label, 2006)
 My Cat Is An Alien / Fabio Orsi - 'For Alan Lomax' split CD (A Silent Place, 2006)
 Text Of Light / My Cat Is An Alien - 'Cosmic Debris, Vol.I' split ART-LP / CD (Opax Records, 2006 / A Silent Place, 2007)
 Steve Roden / My Cat Is An Alien - 'Cosmic Debris, Vol.II' split ART-LP / CD (Opax Records, 2007 / A Silent Place, 2007)
 Keiji Haino / My Cat Is An Alien - 'Cosmic Debris, Vol.III' split ART-LP / CD (Opax Records, 2007 / A Silent Place, 2007)
 Mats Gustafsson / My Cat Is An Alien - 'Cosmic Debris, Vol.IV' split ART-LP / CD (Opax Records, 2008 / A Silent Place, 2009)
 Loren Connors & Haunted House / My Cat Is An Alien - 'Cosmic Debris, Vol.V' split ART-LP (Opax Records, 2008)
 Family Underground / My Cat Is An Alien split LP (Reverse, 2007)
 Praxinoscope / My Cat Is An Alien - 'For the tears of the Land_Prayers from the outer space' split 2LP / 2CD (Important Records, 2009 / Elliptical Noise, 2009)
 Pestrepeller / My Cat Is An Alien split Picture Disc LP (A Silent Place, 2009)
 My Cat Is An Alien & Enore Zaffiri - 'Through The Magnifying Glass Of Tomorrow' CD+DVD (Atavistic, 2009)
 Michael Morley, My Cat Is An Alien, Ramona Ponzini, Lee Ranaldo - 'Live @ Sensational Fix' LP (Starlight Furniture Co., 2009)
 My Cat Is An Alien & Bjerga/Iversen LP (Ikuisuus / Gold Soundz, 2010)
 My Cat Is An Alien, Ramona Ponzini, Lee Ranaldo - 'All Is Lost In Translation' CD (Atavistic, 2010)
 BBNU & MCIAA - 'Gramofonu = voice of the Universe' LP (Opax Records / Love Nest, 2011)

SINGLES, EPs

 Hypnotic Spaces ep CD-r (Opax Records, 1998)
 Alien Dissolving ep CD-r (Opax Records/ ZZZ Prod., 1999)
 Everything Is Here lathe-cut 7 inch (Gold Soundz, 2005)
 Introducing The Cosmic Blues 7 inch (Important Records, 2006)
 My Cat Is An Alien / Corsican Paintbrush split 10 inch lathe cut (Opax Records/ Foxglove, 2006)
 Different Shades of Tape Box C60 cassette + 7 inch + T-shirt (A Silent Place, 2007)
 My Cat Is An Alien / Valerio Cosi - 'Stories From The Vacuum' split 7 inch (Black Horizon, 2008)
 8 inch Triangular Lathe Cut Record (Pseudoarcana, 2008)
 My Cat Is An Alien / Moonmilk - 'Paseridae I' split 7 inch (Sound&Fury, 2009)

COMPILATIONS

 "Alien cats’ attack!" on 'Tracce' CD (Wallace Rec, 1999)
 "World War" (The Cure) on 'La Cattedrale vs the 80’s' CD (White&Black, 1999)
 "I sold an alien to the F.B.I." on 'Related ProZZZect' CD + CD-r (ZZZ Prod.,1999)
 "Hear the voice of the Cosmos" on 'The Tone of the Universe (= The Tone of the Earth)' 2CD (Pseudoarcana, 2005)
 "Alien substratum 1.0/1.2" on 'Time and Relative Dimensions in Space: Long Form Works' CD (Rebis, 2005)
 "Elegy for all the extinct alien species" on 'The Invisible Pyramid: Elegy Box 6CD (Last Visible Dog, 2005)
 "Astral Enlightenment" on Dream Magazine No. 6 CD + Magazine (Dream Magazine, 2006)
 "Aliens in the Crowd" on 'Random Sounds Vol.2' CD-r (Indie Workshop, 2006)
 "Alien Beings" on 'Música Salvaje Desde el Infinito Cosmos' CD-r (Buh Records, 2010)
 "The Antigravitational Sense Of Nothingness" on 'Wire Tapper 25' CD + Magazine (The Wire, 2011)

ROBERTO OPALIO	
 Chants From Isolated Ghosts CD-r / lathe-cut ART-LP (Opax Records, 2005)
 Voice With No Guitar/ Guitar With No Voice C20 cassette (Opax Tapes, 2005)
 The Last Night of the Angel of Glass DVD-r + CD-r set (Foxglove, 2006)
 "Transparent moods" on Orange Gold C20 Cassette Comp (Gold Soundz, 2006)
 Whispers of the Last Light DVD-r (Opax Records, 2006)
 The last night of the Angel of Glass, Vol.I & II 2CD / 2 lathe cut ART-LP + DVD  (A Silent Place, 2007 / Opax Records, 2009)
 Chants from isolated ghosts CD (Important Records, 2007)
 Whispers of the last Light, part I & II lathe cut ART-LP + DVD (Opax Records, 2007)
 "In the Middle of the Air" (split with Maurizio Opalio) LP (Important Records, 2009)
 My Alien Notes (Escaping the Void?) art book + CD (Opax Press, 2009)
 "Blue Ether" (with Michael Morley, Ramona Ponzini, Lee Ranaldo) in 'Live @ Sensational Fix' LP (Starlight Furniture Co., 2009)
 Liquid Spring (with Maurizio Opalio) CD (Elliptical Noise, 2009)
 The Hexagram on Grace CD (Elliptical Noise, 2010)
 Il Lungo Inverno lathe cut ART LP (Opax Editions, 2011)

MAURIZIO OPALIO	

 Way up to Enfer CD-r / lathe cut ART-LP + book (Opax Records, 2006 / 2007)
 "Glacier Sommeiller" (split with Roberto Opalio) LP (Important Records, 2009)
 "Passo Galambra" (with Michael Morley, Ramona Ponzini, Lee Ranaldo) in 'Live @ Sensational Fix' LP (Starlight Furniture Co., 2009)
 Liquid Spring (with Roberto Opalio) CD (Elliptical Noise, 2009)
 Il Lungo Inverno lathe cut ART LP (Opax Editions, 2011)

PAINTING PETALS ON PLANET GHOST (Ramona Ponzini, Maurizio Opalio, Roberto Opalio)
	
 Haru LP / CD (Time-Lag Records, 2005 / 2007)
 "Oceano" on Red Gold C20 Cassette Comp (Gold Soundz, 2006)
 Oounabara 1-sided lathe cut ART-LP + DVD (Opax Records, 2006)
 Oounabara C20 cassette (Opax Records, 2006)
 Fallen Camellias 1-sided 5x10inch lathe cut ART Box (Opax Records, 2008)
 Fallen Camellias CD (A Silent Place, 2008)
 "I lose consciousness" (split with Mykel Boyd) 7 inch (Somnimage, 2008)
 "Haru no kuni" on Dream Magazine No. 9 CD Comp + Magazine (Dream Magazine, 2009)
 Haru No Omoi CD (PSF Japan, 2009)

PRAXINOSCOPE (Roberto Opalio & Ramona Ponzini)
	
 s/t CD-r / Picture Disc LP (Opax Records, 2005 / A Silent Place, 2006)
 Epocsonixarp LP / CD-r (Opax Records, 2006)
 Untitled No. 6 1-sided C20 cassette (Opax Tapes, 2008)
 For the tears of the Land_Prayers from the outer space (split with My Cat Is An Alien) 2LP / 2CD (Important Records, 2009 / Elliptical Noise, 2009)

BLACK MAGIC DISCO (Maurizio & Roberto Opalio, Ramona Ponzini, Tom Greenwood)
 s/t CD / 2LP (Important Records, 2007 / A Silent Place, 2007)

MUSIC FOR PHANTOMS (Maurizio & Roberto Opalio)
 I - CD-r + DVD (Opax Records, 2007)
 I - lathe cut ART-LP (Opax Editions, 2010)
 II - lathe cut ART-LP (Opax Editions, 2010)

ONE LONELY ALIEN CAT (Roberto Opalio)
 In The Blue Alien Dim Light ART CD-r (Opax Records, 1999)

ORANGE CAR CRASH (My Cat Is An Alien, Amour en Stéréophonie, Viggiu Vortex)
 Lights in the Space Room LP (Opax Records, 2002)

References

External links
 Official MCIAA website
 Official MCIAA biog
 Part MCIAA discog

Italian musical duos
Musical groups established in 1997
Sibling musical duos
Italian experimental rock groups